Marshy Hope Wildlife Area is a state wildlife area located in Sussex County, Delaware, near the town of Bridgeville, Delaware, and along the Maryland and Delaware border and along the Delaware side of the Marshyhope Creek. It is made up of three land tracts totaling . It is managed by Delaware Department of Natural Resources and Environmental Control (DNREC), Department of Fish and Wildlife.

References

Protected areas of Delaware
Protected areas of Sussex County, Delaware